Laxárdalur (Old Norse: Laxárdalr ) is a region in northwestern Iceland. It was the setting for the Laxdæla saga and the home of such famous early Icelanders as Aud the Deep-Minded, Hoskuld Dala-Kollsson, Hrútr Herjólfsson, and Olaf the Peacock.

Geography of Iceland

Regions of Iceland